Fort Amherst is a neighbourhood in St. John's, Newfoundland and Labrador. Apart from some family dwellings, Fort Amherst consists of a man-made harbour, a lighthouse and the remains of gun emplacements built during World War II to defend against German U-boats. Two QF 4.7-inch B Mark IV* guns remain in place on their mountings.

The original fortifications at Fort Amherst, built in the 1770s, are no longer visible. The fortifications were named for William Amherst, who successfully recaptured St. John's from French forces in 1762.  The fort operated in conjunction with Fort Waldegrave for much of its history. The site was designated a National Historic Site of Canada in 1951.

The name is shared with Port La-Joye / Fort Amherst in Prince Edward Island and Fort Amherst in England.

The first lighthouse in Newfoundland was built at Fort Amherst in 1810. The current lighthouse was built in 1951.

See also
List of lighthouses in Canada
Neighbourhoods in St. John's, Newfoundland and Labrador

Gallery

References

Neighbourhoods in St. John's, Newfoundland and Labrador
Populated coastal places in Canada
Coastal fortifications
Military forts in Newfoundland and Labrador
World War II sites in Canada
National Historic Sites in Newfoundland and Labrador
History of St. John's, Newfoundland and Labrador